Wepitanock (also known as Momojosbuck or Wettamozo or Aquawoce) (died after 1651) was an Eastern Niantic chief sachem.

Wepitanock was likely Canonicus' nephew and was the older brother of Ninigret with whom he shared power. His sister was Queen Quaiapen. Wepitanock had at least one wife (whose name is unknown but who may have been a Pequot as she is referred to as a "stranger"). Roger Williams describes Wepitanock as Miantonomi's brother in law. Wepitanock had at least four sons and one daughter, who married her uncle Ninigret. Wepitanock's sons were Harman Garrett and Wequash Cooke and Tomtico and another unnamed son who died in 1650 according to Roger Williams. After Wepitanock's death Ninigret contested the claims to power of Wepitanock's sons because they were only half Niantic.

References

People of colonial Rhode Island
Native American leaders
Niantic people
17th-century Native Americans